Yodkhunpon Sitmonchai (ยอดขุนพล ศิษย์มนต์ชัย) is a Thai Muay Thai and Kickboxing fighter.

As of October 2014 Yodkhunpon was ranked as the #8 ranked Featherweight kickboxer in the world by Liverkick.

Biography and career

Yodkhunpon participated in the 2014 Glory Featherweight Contendership Tournament at Glory 17: Los Angeles in Inglewood, California, US on June 21, 2014. He was defeated by Gabriel Varga in the semi-finals via unanimous decision.

Yodkhunpon challenged Capitan Petchyindee Academy for his Lumpinee Stadium Super Welterweight title on January 3, 2020. He lost the fight by unanimous decision. The two of them fought a rematch a month later, with Capitan once against winning a decision.

Titles and accomplishments
 2018 Top King World Series -70 kg Champion

Fight record

|- style="background:#cfc" 
| 2023-02-11 ||Win ||align="left" | Jos Mendonca || Rajadamnern World Series + Petchyindee  || Bangkok, Thailand || Decision (Unanimous)||3 ||3:00 
|- style="background:#cfc" 
| 2022-12-16 || Win ||align="left" | Sajad Sattari || Rajadamnern World Series  || Bangkok, Thailand || Decision (Split)|| 3 ||3:00 
|- style="background:#fbb" 
| 2022-11-04 || Loss||align="left" | Shadow Singmawynn || Rajadamnern World Series - Semi Final || Bangkok, Thailand || Decision (Unanimous) || 3||3:00
|- style="background:#fbb" 
| 2022-09-30 || Loss ||align="left" | Sibmuen Sitchefboontham || Rajadamnern World Series - Group Stage || Bangkok, Thailand ||Decision (Unanimous) || 3 || 3:00
|- style="background:#cfc" 
| 2022-08-26 || Win ||align="left" | Mohamed Cheboub || Rajadamnern World Series - Group Stage|| Bangkok, Thailand || Decision (Unanimous)|| 3 || 3:00 
|- style="background:#cfc" 
| 2022-07-22 ||Win ||align="left" | Julio Lobo || Rajadamnern World Series - Group Stage || Bangkok, Thailand || KO (Left hook) || 2|| 
|- style="background:#cfc" 
| 2022-04-30 ||Win ||align="left" | Yanis Mazouni ||  MX MUAY XTREME  || Phuket, Thailand || KO (Right hook) || 1||0:42 
|-
! style=background:white colspan=9 |
|-  style="background:#fbb;"
| 2022-03-25|| Loss||align=left| Thoeun Theara || Kun Khmer All Star 3 || Phnom Penh, Cambodia || TKO (Elbow) || 1 || 2:20
|-  style="background:#c5d2ea;"
| 2021-10-22|| Draw||align=left| Rafael Angobaldo || Muay Hardcore ||  Thailand || Decision || 3 || 3:00
|-  style="background:#fbb;"
| 2020-02-07|| Loss||align=left| Capitan Petchyindee Academy || Lumpinee Stadium || Bangkok, Thailand || Decision || 5 || 3:00
|-  style="background:#fbb;"
| 2020-01-03|| Loss||align=left| Capitan Petchyindee Academy || Lumpinee Stadium || Bangkok, Thailand || Decision || 5 || 3:00
|-
! style=background:white colspan=9 |
|- style="background:#cfc;"
| 2019-11-29 || Win||align=left| Sorgraw Petchyindee || Lumpinee Stadium || Bangkok, Thailand || Decision  || 5 || 3:00
|-  bgcolor="#fbb"
| 2018-12-31 || Loss ||align=left| Simanoot Sor.Sarinya || Top King World Series 27, Semi Final || Thailand || Decision  || 3 || 3:00
|-  bgcolor="#cfc"
| 2018-09-29 || Win||align=left| Nikita Gerasimovich || Top King World Series 22 || Thailand || Decision (unanimous) || 3 || 3:00
|-  bgcolor="#cfc"
| 2018-06-16 || Win||align=left| Fabian Hundt || Top King World Series 21 || Thailand || Decision (unanimous) || 3 || 3:00
|-  bgcolor="#cfc"
| 2018-05-26 || Win||align=left| Luis Passos || Top King World Series 20 || Bangkok, Thailand || Decision  || 3 || 3:00
|-  style="background:#fbb;"
| 2018-05-12|| Loss ||align=left| George Mann || Rebellion Muay Thai 19 ||  Melbourne, Australia || Decision (Split) || 5 || 3:00
|-  style="background:#cfc;"
| 2018-03-17|| Win ||align=left| Manaowan Sitsongpeenong || Topking World Series 18, Final ||  Thailand || Decision || 3 || 3:00
|-
! style=background:white colspan=9 |
|-  style="background:#cfc;"
| 2018-03-17|| Win ||align=left| Capitan Petchyindee Academy || Topking World Series 18, Semi Final ||  Thailand || Decision || 3 || 3:00
|-  style="background:#cfc;"
| 2017-11-17|| Win ||align=left| Liu Lei || EM Legend 25 ||  China || Decision || 3 || 3:00
|- style="background:#fbb;"
| 2017-09-30 || Loss||align=left| Tyjani Beztati || Glory 45: Amsterdam || Amsterdam, Netherlands || Decision (Unanimous) || 3 || 3:00
|-  bgcolor="#cfc"
| 2017-05-27 || Win||align=left| Ben Mahony || Top King World Series 13 || Wuhan, China || Decision (unanimous) || 3 || 3:00
|-  bgcolor="#fbb"
| 2017-04-29 || Loss||align=left| Niclas Larsen || Glory 40: Copenhagen || Copenhagen, Denmark || Decision (unanimous) || 3 || 3:00
|-  bgcolor="#fbb"
| 2017-? || Loss||align=left| Guo Dongwang|| EM Legend|| China || Decision  || 3 || 3:00
|-  bgcolor="#fbb"
| 2017-01-14 || Loss||align=left| Arbi Emiev|| Top King World Series 12, Semi Final || China || Decision  || 3 || 3:00
|-  bgcolor="#cfc"
| 2016-11-27 || Win||align=left| Kevin Renahy || Top King World Series 11 || Nanchang, China || TKO || 3 ||
|-  bgcolor="#cfc"
| 2016-08-27 || Win||align=left| Aleksandr Pisarev || Top King World Series 10 || China || Decision  || 3 || 3:00
|-  bgcolor="#cfc"
| 2016-07-10 || Win||align=left| Esteban Lopez || Top King World Series 9 || Luoyang, China || TKO (Punches)|| 1 ||
|-  style="background:#fbb;"
| 2016-06-05 || Loss ||align=left| Farkhad Akhmejanau || The Legend of Emei 9 || Chengdu, China || Ext.R Decision || 4 || 3:00
|-  style="background:#fbb;"
| 2016-04-29 || Loss ||align=left| YodDiesel LukchoaMaeSaiThong || Toyota Marathon, Quarter Final || Chonburi, Thailand || Decision || 3 || 3:00
|-  bgcolor="#fbb"
| 2016-02-27 || Loss||align=left| Sang-Uthai Sor.Jor.Piek-Uthai || Omnoi Stadium || Samut Sakhon, Thailand || Decision  || 5 || 3:00
|-  style="background:#fbb;"
| 2015-12-26|| Loss||align=left| Capitan Petchyindee Academy || Omnoi Stadium - Isuzu Cup, Semi Final ||  Samut Sakhon, Thailand || Decision || 5 ||3:00
|-  style="background:#cfc;"
| 2015-11-14|| Win ||align=left| Suayngarm Pumphanmuang || Omnoi Stadium - Isuzu Cup ||  Samut Sakhon, Thailand || KO || 1 ||
|-  style="background:#cfc;"
| 2015-10-07|| Win ||align=left| Chokdee Sor.Thanaphet || Omnoi Stadium - Isuzu Cup ||  Samut Sakhon, Thailand || KO (Flying Elbow)|| 3 ||
|-  bgcolor="#cfc"
| 2015-09-05 || Win ||align=left| Sang-Uthai Sor.Jor.Piek-Uthai || Omnoi Stadium - Isuzu Cup || Samut Sakhon, Thailand || Decision  || 5 || 3:00
|-  bgcolor="#cfc"
| 2015-04-14 || Win ||align=left| Armin Pumpanmuang ||  || Bang Saphan District, Thailand || KO || 3 ||
|-  style="background:#fbb;"
| 2014-06-21 || Loss||align=left| Gabriel Varga || Glory 17: Los Angeles - Featherweight Contender Tournament, Semi Final || Inglewood, California, US || Decision (Unanimous) || 3 || 3:00
|-  style="background:#cfc;"
| 2014-04-12 || Win||align=left| Raz Sarkisjan || Glory 15: Istanbul || Istanbul, Turkey || Decision (Majority) || 3 || 3:00
|-  style="background:#fbb;"
| 2013-11-04 || Loss||align=left| Chamuaktong Fightermuaythai || Rajadamnern Stadium || Bangkok, Thailand || Decision || 5 || 3:00
|-  style="background:#fbb;"
| 2013-09-17 || Loss ||align=left| Yodtuantong Petchyindeeacademy ||  Lumpinee Stadium || Bangkok, Thailand || Decision || 5 || 3:00
|-  style="background:#cfc;"
| 2013-07-26 || Win||align=left| Yodtuantong Petchyindeeacademy ||  Lumpinee Stadium || Bangkok, Thailand || Decision || 5 || 3:00
|-  style="background:#cfc;"
| 2013-05-03 || Win||align=left| Denkiri Sor.Sommai ||  Lumpinee Stadium || Bangkok, Thailand || Decision || 5 || 3:00
|-  style="background:#fbb;"
| 2013-04-09 || Loss||align=left| Yokwithaya Petseemuan  ||  Lumpinee Stadium || Bangkok, Thailand || Decision || 5 || 3:00
|-  style="background:#fbb;"
| 2013-01-25 || Loss||align=left| Palangtip Nor Sripung  ||  Lumpinee Stadium || Bangkok, Thailand || Decision || 5 || 3:00
|-  style="background:#cfc;"
| 2012-11-10 ||Win||align=left| Lekkla Tanasuranakorn || Ladprao Stadium || Bangkok, Thailand || Decision || 5 || 3:00
|-  style="background:#cfc;"
| 2012-10-04 ||Win||align=left| Palangtip Nor Sripung || Rajadamnern Stadium || Bangkok, Thailand || Decision || 5 || 3:00
|-  style="background:#fbb;"
| 2012-09-11 || Loss||align=left| Petpanomrung Kiatmuu9  || Petchpiya Fights, Lumpinee Stadium || Bangkok, Thailand || Decision || 5 || 3:00
|-  style="background:#cfc;"
| 2012-07-06 ||Win||align=left| Jaisoo Thor.Thepsuthin || Lumpinee Stadium || Bangkok, Thailand || KO (Punches)|| 1 ||
|-  style="background:#cfc;"
| 2012-05-25 ||Win||align=left| Kwankhao Mor.Ratanabandit || Lumpinee Stadium || Bangkok, Thailand || KO (Punches)||  ||
|-  style="background:#cfc;"
| 2012-04-03 ||Win||align=left| Kwankhao Mor.Ratanabandit || Lumpinee Stadium || Bangkok, Thailand || Decision || 5 || 3:00
|-  style="background:#cfc;"
| 2012-03-13 ||Win||align=left| Dechsakda Sitsonpeenong || Lumpinee Stadium || Bangkok, Thailand || Decision || 5 || 3:00
|-  style="background:#cfc;"
| 2012-02-03 ||Win||align=left| Dechsakda Sitsonpeenong || Lumpinee Stadium || Bangkok, Thailand || Decision || 5 || 3:00
|-  style="background:#fbb;"
| 2011-05-20 ||Loss||align=left| Dechsakda Sitsonpeenong || Lumpinee Stadium || Bangkok, Thailand || Decision || 5 || 3:00
|-  style="background:#cfc;"
| 2011-04-29 || Win||align=left| Thongchai Sitsongpeenong ||  || Thailand || TKO || 2 || 
|-  style="background:#fbb;"
| 2010-11-23 || Loss||align=left| Yodwicha Por Boonsit || Lumpinee Stadium || Bangkok, Thailand || Decision || 5 || 3:00
|-
| colspan=9 | Legend:

References

Yodkhunpon Sitmonchai
Living people
1994 births
Yodkhunpon Sitmonchai